In Greek mythology, the name Leonteus referred to the following individuals:

 Leonteus, also given in one source as father of Ixion.
Leonteus, brother of Andraemon, who married Amphinome, daughter of Pelias.
 Leonteus, defender of Thebes in the war of the Seven. He was slain by Hippomedon.
Leonteus, son of Coronus (the son of Caeneus) and Cleobule, was one of the commanders of the Lapiths during the Trojan War. Together with his associate, Polypoetes (son of Pirithous), he led the soldiers from the Thessalian cities of Argissa, Gyrtone, Orthe, Elone and Oloosson. He was credited with killing five people during the war: Antiphates, Hippomachus, Iamenus, Menon and Orestes.

See also 
 Jovian asteroid 3793 Leonteus

Notes

References 

 Diodorus Siculus, The Library of History translated by Charles Henry Oldfather. Twelve volumes. Loeb Classical Library. Cambridge, Massachusetts: Harvard University Press; London: William Heinemann, Ltd. 1989. Vol. 3. Books 4.59–8. Online version at Bill Thayer's Web Site
 Diodorus Siculus, Bibliotheca Historica. Vol 1-2. Immanel Bekker. Ludwig Dindorf. Friedrich Vogel. in aedibus B. G. Teubneri. Leipzig. 1888-1890. Greek text available at the Perseus Digital Library.
 Gaius Julius Hyginus, Fabulae from The Myths of Hyginus translated and edited by Mary Grant. University of Kansas Publications in Humanistic Studies. Online version at the Topos Text Project.
 Homer, The Iliad with an English Translation by A.T. Murray, Ph.D. in two volumes. Cambridge, MA., Harvard University Press; London, William Heinemann, Ltd. 1924. . Online version at the Perseus Digital Library.
 Homer, Homeri Opera in five volumes. Oxford, Oxford University Press. 1920. . Greek text available at the Perseus Digital Library.
 Publius Papinius Statius, The Thebaid translated by John Henry Mozley. Loeb Classical Library Volumes. Cambridge, MA, Harvard University Press; London, William Heinemann Ltd. 1928. Online version at the Topos Text Project.
 Publius Papinius Statius, The Thebaid. Vol I-II. John Henry Mozley. London: William Heinemann; New York: G.P. Putnam's Sons. 1928. Latin text available at the Perseus Digital Library.
Tzetzes, John, Allegories of the Iliad translated by Goldwyn, Adam J. and Kokkini, Dimitra. Dumbarton Oaks Medieval Library, Harvard University Press, 2015. 

Achaean Leaders
Thessalian mythology
Characters in Seven against Thebes